Fenerbahçe TV (FB TV) is a sports channel of Fenerbahçe SK, a major Turkish multi-sport club based in Istanbul, Turkey. It is the first sports club channel in Turkey. The channel launched in 2003, over satellite, satellite network services and cable service.

The daily programs are Live News, Futbolun Zirvesi (live program with president Aziz Yıldırım), 2F1B, Biz Bir Aileyiz (about the family life of athletes), Café Fener (about the daily life of athletes), Eko Fener (about daily economy news), Endüstriyel Spor (about "industrial" sports), Filede Fener (about volleyball), Potada Fener (about basketball), Genç Kramponlar (about the youth teams), Maç Kaç Kaç, Maça Doğru, Maç Başlıyor, Maçın Ardından, Maçın Öyküsü (all five are about weekly football matches), Nostalji Futbol (about past memorable matches), Yaşayan Efsaneler (about the lives of living legends) etc.

The live programs of TV are daily news, women's basketball, men's and women's volleyball, youth football, athletics, boxing, rowing and sailing live games and matches and news before matches.

Commentators/Presenters
Hande karakadıoğlu
Kıvanç Özkök
Serhan Hayat
Barış Yalçınsoy
Turhan Seven

Services
Satellite
Turksat 4A 12345 V 30000 3/4
Digiturk : Channel 76
D-Smart : Channel 83
Cable
Teledünya : Channel 139

References

External links
 

Fenerbahçe S.K.
Television stations in Turkey
Turkish-language television stations
Sports television networks
Sports television in Turkey
Television channels and stations established in 2003
2003 establishments in Turkey
Mass media in Istanbul